Chester Marlon Hanks (born August 4, 1990) is an American actor and musician. The son of actors Tom Hanks and Rita Wilson, he has had recurring roles on Empire and Shameless. Hanks also appeared as Joey Maldini in the Showtime legal drama miniseries Your Honor.

Early life
Chet Hanks is the third child of Tom Hanks, and the first child born to Hanks and actress Rita Wilson.

During high school, Hanks' parents sent Hanks to a wilderness therapy program for troubled teens. Hanks later attended the Oakley School, a now-closed therapeutic boarding school in Oakley, Utah. Hanks played lacrosse there.

He studied theater at Northwestern University where he was a member of the Pi Kappa Alpha fraternity. His older half-brother is actor Colin Hanks.

Career

Acting 
Hanks' acting career began with his debut role as Dexter in the 2007 film Bratz. Soon after, his acting career picked up with a string of small film roles in the early 2010s. He was active in television in the latter half of the decade after achieving sobriety. From 2016 to 2018, Hanks appeared as Charlie, the father of character Sierra Morton's child, on the American version of Shameless. He played rapper Blake on hip-hop drama Empire from 2018 to 2019. In 2020, he had a cameo in the World War II film Greyhound starring his father. Starting later that year, he portrayed Joey Maldini, the best friend of a hit-and-run victim's brother, in the Showtime courtroom miniseries Your Honor.

Music 
In 2011, while a student at Northwestern University, Hanks recorded "White and Purple" under the alias Chet Haze. The song was a remix of Wiz Khalifa's single "Black and Yellow" with the lyrics changed in reference to his school colors.

Hanks and Drew Arthur formed the musical duo FTRZ after being introduced in 2016. In 2018, they released two singles ("Models" and "NowhereLand") as well as the Ocean Park EP. The duo released two tracks in 2020, "Harley" and "Ticket Out My Head" under the new name Something Out West.

Personal life
Hanks has a daughter, Michaiah, born April 2016, with former partner Tiffany Miles. Hanks credits his daughter and his parents for helping him to overcome his struggles with substance abuse.

Along with his parents, Hanks was granted Greek citizenship in 2020 in recognition for his parents' work raising awareness for the 2018 Attica wildfires.

Politics 
In the summer of 2020, Hanks posted on Instagram in support of the Black Lives Matter movement. That October, he announced a social media hiatus, citing "pro-Trump conspiracy theorists" targeting his family. QAnon believers had falsely accused his father of pedophilic and Satanic activity that year. Following his return to Instagram earlier in the month, he posted a video, insulting Donald Trump on November 7, the day that news outlets called the 2020 United States presidential election for Joe Biden.

Controversies
Hanks has described himself as the black sheep of his family due to the contrast between his public controversies and his father's clean-cut image as "America's dad".

In 2015, Hanks was wanted by British police after damaging a hotel room, incurring $1800 in damages. He entered rehab for cocaine addiction that year.

A judge in Fort Bend County, Texas granted Hanks’ former girlfriend Kiana Parker a temporary protective order against him in January 2021; in her filing, she described months of verbal and physical abuse. Early that March, Hanks filed a lawsuit against Parker for theft, conversion, assault, and battery, stemming from an altercation on January 8. Footage of the event, in which Hanks can be seen bleeding, was released by TMZ on March 31.

On March 26, 2021, Hanks posted a video to Instagram declaring a "White Boy Summer." While the video was mostly received with good humor, merchandise released by Hanks to capitalize on the expression's popularity was criticized for using a font similar to those favored by white nationalist groups. Hanks' resurgence in the public eye as a result of the video led to increased coverage of his legal battles with Parker.

On August 10, 2021, Hanks posted a video to Instagram initially urging viewers to get vaccinated for COVID-19. He then revealed it was a joke and denied being vaccinated himself, claiming, "You ain’t sticking me with that motherfucking needle. It’s the motherfucking flu. Get over it, okay?" He received backlash for these comments on social media, with many pointing out that his parents had developed COVID-19 the previous year and publicly encouraged others to get vaccinated as a result.

Filmography

Film

Television

References

External links
 

1990 births
21st-century American male actors
American male film actors
American male television actors
Living people
Northwestern University alumni
People from California
American male musicians
American people of English descent
American people of Greek descent
American people of Bulgarian descent
American people of Portuguese descent